Dmytro Ihorovych Kryskiv (born 6 October 2000) is a Ukrainian professional footballer who plays as a midfielder for Shakhtar Donetsk in the Ukrainian Premier League.

Career
Born in Kharkiv, Kryskiv began his career in the local Metalist Kharkiv youth academy, until his transfer to the Shakhtar Donetsk youth system in 2016.

He played in the Ukrainian Premier League Reserves and never made his debut for the senior Shakhtar Donetsk squad. In September 2020 Kryskiv went on loan to Ukrainian Premier League club FC Mariupol, but a month later he went on loan to the Ukrainian First League Metalist 1925 Kharkiv and made his debut in a home match against Polissya Zhytomyr on 5 October 2020.

In April 2021 Kryskiv was recognized as a player of the month in the Ukrainian First League.

References

External links
 
 

2000 births
Living people
Footballers from Kharkiv
Ukrainian footballers
Ukraine youth international footballers
Ukraine under-21 international footballers
Association football midfielders
FC Shakhtar Donetsk players
FC Mariupol players
FC Metalist 1925 Kharkiv players
Ukrainian Premier League players
Ukrainian First League players